The Bohemian National Alliance (later Czech National Alliance) was an American political party founded in Chicago, Illinois, on September 6, 1914. The party represented Czech American voters who supported the creation of Czechoslovakia as a state independent of Austria-Hungary.  The party was disestablished in 1918 after Czechoslovakia became an independent nation.  The Bohemian National Alliance published a journal titled The Bohemian Review from 1917.

Further reading

 Pergler, Charles.  Bohemia's Claim To Independence (1916), Kessinger Publishing, LLC, 2010.
 Masaryk, T.G.  The voice of an oppressed people, Library of Congress, 1917.

References

External links
 Czechs In World War (Part 1)
 'Appeals to Bohemians' in the New York Times

Czech-American history
Czech-American culture in Chicago
Czech nationalism
Defunct political parties in the United States
Ethnicity in politics
Independence movements
Nationalist parties in the United States
Political parties established in 1914
Political parties disestablished in 1918
Secessionist organizations